Loyola School, Kalinganagar is a private Catholic secondary school, located in Kalinganagar, Odisha, India. 

Founded in 2016 by the Society of Jesus, the school prepares students for the Indian Certificate of Secondary Education Examination (ICSE, 10th) and the Indian School Certificate Examination (ISC, 12th).

See also

 Catholic Church in India
 Education in India
 List of Jesuit schools

References 

Jesuit secondary schools in India
Schools in Odisha
Educational institutions established in 2016
2016 establishments in Odisha